St Joseph's College is a government-aided, Christian minority, co-educational college in West Bengal, India about 3 km north of downtown Darjeeling. It has been awarded Grade B+(3rd Cycle) by NAAC. It grew out of St. Joseph's School established in 1888. The college began in 1927 when it was affiliated to Calcutta University. In 1962 the college was affiliated with the newly established  University of North Bengal Undergraduate programs include Liberal Arts, Commerce and Science, as well as Business Administration Mass Communication & Journalism and Computer Application.

History

In 1927 the college was affiliated to Calcutta University. By 1949 it was fully accredited to offer courses in B.A. and B.Sc. In 1962 with the establishment of the University of North Bengal the college was affiliated to that university.  In 1963 St. Joseph's moved to new school premises at the present site.  A master's degree in English has been offered since 2006.

Notable alumni
 Mahendra P. Lama, Professor at Jawaharlal Nehru University, New Delhi and politician who contested 2009 Lok Sabha election from Darjeeling.
 Jyoti Prakash Tamang, food microbiologist and N-Bios laureate
Danny Denzongpa, Indian film actor, singer, film director and businessman.
Louis Banks, Indian film music composer, singer, record producer, keyboardist and musician .
Gyanendra Shah, Nepal's ex-king, who ruled Nepal 2 times .
King Birendra,  Nepal's ex-king, killed in Nepalese royal massacre in 2001 .
Paras Shah, Nepal's ex-Crown Prince, Son of Gyanendra Shah .
Neiphiu Rio, Chief Minister of Nagaland .

See also

References

External links
St.Josephs College
University of North Bengal
University Grants Commission
National Assessment and Accreditation Council

Jesuit universities and colleges in India
Colleges affiliated to University of North Bengal
Universities and colleges in Darjeeling district
Education in Darjeeling
Educational institutions established in 1927
1927 establishments in India